Nzizi Power Station is a planned  natural gas-fired thermal power plant  in Uganda.

Location
The power plant is planned to be constructed in Nzizi, near the Nzizi Natural Gas & Oil Field, in the Kaiso-Tonya Area in Hoima District in the Western Region of Uganda. The approximate coordinates of the power station are 1°31'16.0"N, 30°58'05.0"E (Latitude:1.521104; Longitude:30.968047). The coordinates are approximate because the power station has not yet been built.

Overview
The power station is a planned joint project by Tullow Oil Uganda Limited, who will supply the fuel, and Jacobsen Electricity Company (Uganda) Limited, a wholly owned subsidiary of Jacobsen Elektro AS, an independent Norwegian power production company, who will construct and operate the plant.

The plant will primarily use natural gas to heat water and produce steam that will turn the turbines to produce electricity. If need be, the plant will also be designed to use heavy fuel oil, a byproduct of petroleum distillation, as an alternative fuel. The Nzizi Natural Gas & Oil Field, from which the power station will draw its fuel, has confirmed natural gas reserves of at least . The power generated will be evacuated along a 132 kilovolt transmission line to a substation in Hoima, where the power will be integrated into the national power grid. According to Uganda's government officials, construction is expected to commence in 2016 and last 10 months, with commissioning in 2017.

Construction costs
The total cost for the power plant is estimated at US$170 million (UGX:436.9 billion). Of that, US$25.5 million (UGX:65.5 billion) representing 15 percent of the total, will be contributed by the Ugandan government.

See also

Uganda Oil Refinery
Uganda National Oil Company
List of power stations in Uganda
Hoima–Kampala Petroleum Products Pipeline

References

External links
  Approximate Location of Nzizi Power Station
Embracing all forms of power generation: Getting to grips with the rural challenge

Natural gas-fired power stations in Uganda
Proposed power stations in Uganda
Hoima District